Mickaël Gouin is a Canadian actor and television writer from Drummondville, Quebec. He is most noted for his role in the sketch comedy series SNL Québec, the Quebec adaptation of Saturday Night Live, and its spinoff Le nouveau show.

He has also appeared in the films Our Loved Ones (Nos êtres chers), Nelly, Barefoot at Dawn (Pieds nus dans l'aube),  Underground (Souterrain), The Greatest Country in the World (Le meilleur pays du monde) and Lines of Escape (Lignes de fuite), the television series 19-2, Mon ex à moi, Hubert et Fanny, En tout cas and Escouade 99, and the web series Pitch, 7$ par jour, La règle de 3 and Adulthood (L'Âge adulte). He won a Prix Gémeaux for Best Original Series Produced for Digital Media: Comedy, Variety in 2014 as a co-creator of Pitch.

He is in a romantic relationship with his frequent costar Léane Labrèche-Dor. In 2018 he premiered the comedic theatrical show On t'aime Mickaël Gouin, in which he and Labrèche-Dor played fictionalized versions of themselves.

References

External links

21st-century Canadian male actors
21st-century Canadian male writers
21st-century Canadian dramatists and playwrights
Canadian comedy writers
Canadian male film actors
Canadian male television actors
Canadian male web series actors
Canadian male stage actors
Canadian male dramatists and playwrights
Canadian dramatists and playwrights in French
Canadian sketch comedians
Canadian television writers
Male actors from Quebec
Writers from Quebec
French Quebecers
People from Drummondville
Living people
Year of birth missing (living people)
Canadian male comedians
Comedians from Quebec